TCL or Tcl or TCLs may refer to:

Business 
 TCL Technology, a Chinese consumer electronics and appliance company
TCL Electronics, a subsidiary of TCL Technology
 Texas Collegiate League, a collegiate baseball league
 Trade Centre Limited, a Crown corporation in Nova Scotia

Computing
 The Common Link, a KOMpatible bulletin board system for MS-DOS
 Transform, clipping, and lighting, a feature of 3D graphics cards
 tCL, CAS latency in RAM timings

Software
 Tcl (Tool Command Language), a computer programming language
 Terminal Control Language, used to program Verifone devices
 Tiny Core Linux, a minimal Linux operating system
 Tymshare Conversational Language, a former experimental interactive language
 Transaction Control Language, a family of computer languages used by database systems to control transactions
 Think Class Library, a class library for Macintosh featured in THINK C

Education 
 Theological College of Lanka, a theological college in Sri Lanka
Trinity College London, the international examination board
 People's Libraries Society, a former educational society in the Prussian partition of Poland
 Transnational College of Lex, a language research institution based in Japan

Science
 TCL (GTPase), in biochemistry.
 Tibial collateral ligament, one of the four major ligaments of the knee.

 Thermostatically controlled load (TCL)

Transportation
 Transports en commun lyonnais, the public transport system in Lyon, France
 Tung Chung line, one of the MTR lines in Hong Kong
 Tuscaloosa National Airport (IATA code), US
Twin City Lines, a former public transit via streetcar in Minneapolis, US